First Love / Last Rites is the third album by Cock Robin and was released in 1989 in Europe and 1990 in the USA.

Track listing
 Stumble and Fall
 Straighter Line
 Win or Lose
 One Joy Bang
 For Experience Sake
 Hunting Down a Killer
 Any More Than I Could Understand
 My First Confession
 Manzanar
 Worlds Apart

All songs by Peter Kingsbery except "For Experience Sake" (Peter Kingsbery/Anna LaCazio)

The US version includes a cover of Conway Twitty's "It's Only Make Believe", added as track #6 (after "For Experience Sake" and before "Hunting Down a Killer").

It was the band's final album before their (temporary) split, which lasted from 1990 to 2006. It proved to be their least successful album of the first half of their career.

Musicians

Cock Robin
 Peter Kingsbery: vocals, keyboards
 Anna LaCazio:  vocals

Additional musicians
 Pat Mastelotto: drums
 Luis Conte: percussion
 Corky James: guitar
 John Pierce: bass
 Ramon Flores, Samuel Nolasco and Xavier Serrano: mariachi horns
 David Faragher: bass on Stumble And Fall, Any More Than I Could Understand and Manzanar
 Paul Mitchell: additional drumming on Manzanar

Miscellaneous
Produced by Rhett Davies

Singles:
 Worlds Apart
 Straighter Line
 Manzanar. It's the name of a Japanese American internment camp located in California during World War II.
 It's Only Make Believe (US)

The CD sleeve features the poem It's Ours by Charles Bukowski, an excerpt from You Get So Alone at Times It Just Makes Sense (1986).

Charts
 #11 France (2x Gold album)

References 

Cock Robin (band) albums
1989 albums
Albums produced by Rhett Davies